Richard Aslatt Pearce (9 January 185521 July 1928) was the first deaf person to be ordained as an Anglican clergyman. He was educated via the sign language of his era, he became Chaplain to the Deaf and Dumb, and he fulfilled this duty in the Southampton area for the rest of his life. In 1885 he was introduced to Queen Victoria, who then ordered the Royal Commission on the Blind, the Deaf and Dumb and Others of the United Kingdom, 1889.

Background

Family
Richard Aslatt Pearce was the grandson of Robert Pearce (born 1785) and Sarah Seward (born ). Their son, and the father of Richard Aslatt, was Richard Seward Pearce (1820–1893), a solicitor and town clerk of Southampton, and Frances Aslatt (1836–1899). Richard and Frances were married in 1854 at South Stoneham. He was born in Portswood on 9 January 1855, one of four siblings of which three were deaf. Two of his siblings were artist Walter Seward (1862–1941) and Fanny (1863–1892), all three described as "deaf and dumb from birth" in the 1881 Census. His single hearing sibling was solicitor Arthur William Pearce (1858–1928).

There are two indications that Pearce did not speak. One is that in his own handwriting on the 1911 Census form he differentiated himself, as "deaf and dumb", from his wife whom he described as "deaf." The second is the Hampshire Advertiser description of his sermon at Golden Common in 1887, as "silent eloquence."

Education
Pearce's father paid £50 per year from 1860 to 1872, for him to attend the Brighton Institution for Deaf and Dumb Children at 127–132 Eastern Road, Kemptown, Brighton, where he received private tuition using only the manual system. His headmaster, who gave him personal tuition via the manual and sign system of that era, was William Sleight. The 1861 Census shows him at six years old, already at the Institution, when it had 82 inmates and two teachers besides the headmaster. In 1871 when Pearce was 16 years old, the Institution had 93 inmates, plus several former female inmates employed as servants and as an assistant teacher. Besides the headmaster who taught, the only other teachers besides the deaf former pupil, were an assistant master and a pupil teacher; however, all the inmates were described as "scholars". In that year, 40 of the inmates were of unknown origin, and 31 were of vague origin, where only the county or country were known.

Marriage
Pearce met his wife Frances Mary Monck (1845 or 1846 – 1930) at St Saviour's, Oxford Street, in 1887, and they married on 26 April 1888. She was born in Dublin, the daughter of Charles Monck, 4th Viscount Monck, who until 1869 had been Governor General of Canada. Her 1911 Census record, completed in her husband's handwriting, says that she was deaf "from illness". Her father did not want them to marry, believing that because they were both deaf, they would be poor, but they moved to Southampton where Pearce was to remain in employment, serving the deaf community for the rest of his life.

Pearce and his wife had no children. It is not known whether Pearce's childlessness had any connection with recommendations of castration of the congenitally deaf by early 19th century eugenicists who held those views which were later developed by Francis Galton. In 1901 he and his wife were living at 2 Christ Church Road, Winchester, with two servants. The 1911 Census finds them living at Christ Church Lodge, Winchester, where he describes himself as "chaplain to the deaf and dumb in the Diocese of Winchester." It is not known why the same record, completed in R.A. Pearce's own hand, states that he and Frances were deaf "from illness," when according to his 1881 Census record, his father informed the enumerator that he was "deaf and dumb from birth." Similarly, the 1861 and 1871 Census, in which the enumerator was informed by the Brighton Institution, state that the inmate Pearce was "deaf and dumb from birth." However, by 1911 a congenital condition such as profound deafness could potentially have made him a target for eugenics. On 21 July 1928 he died in Winchester at his home, two years before the death on 30 October 1930 of his wife Frances.

Work

Pearce left the Institution in 1872 to work in his father's office as a secretary, but in his free time he sought out other deaf people, assisted and educated them, and organised groups for Sunday worship. His group grew in size, so that his time was needed for more mission work with the deaf in Hampshire. By 1881 he was still living with his parents and siblings, describing himself as "lay reader to deaf and dumb," He was ordained deacon on Sunday 21 May 1885 by the Bishop of Winchester, after being mentored via sign language by Reverend Charles Mansfield Owen who was at that time vicar of St George's Church, Edgbaston and was later to become Dean of Ripon. Thus Pearce became, "the first deaf ... clergyman to be ordained in the Church of England." In the same year he became Chaplain to the Deaf and Dumb, employed by the Winchester Diocesan Mission to the Deaf and Dumb, which itself had been established by the efforts of Owen. This organisation founded the Mission Church in Oak Road, Southampton (now demolished), for the continuation of their work in 1891.  It was completed in 1895 with the financial assistance of Sir Arthur Henderson Fairbairn (1852–1915) who was deaf, and other supporters.  The Portsmouth Evening News said this: 

Because he was the first deaf person to be ordained as an Anglican clergyman, Pearce was invited to meet Queen Victoria who "knew deaf people on the Isle of Wight": After meeting Pearce, the Queen requested a Royal Commission on the Blind, the Deaf and Dumb and Others of the United Kingdom, which completed its report in 1889. It included the comment: "The missionary under the bishop of the diocese [of Winchester] (the Rev. R.A. Pearce, who is the only ordained deaf and dumb clergyman in the Church of England) devotes the whole of his time to the work, visiting the deaf and dumb at their homes, or at places of business and workshops." In 1886 Pearce also visited the Institute for the Deaf and Dumb at Derby.

In November 1887, Pearce preached a sermon at St Saviour's in London. "It was a grand service, and was most highly appreciated." On 20 November 1887, he took a communion service and preached a sermon for deaf and hearing people at Holy Trinity, Golden Common, near Winchester, Hampshire. "The deepest attention was paid by the congregations throughout the whole of the services, who perfectly understood them, and expressed hope that the sermon would be long remembered. The parishioners of Golden Common were evidently deeply impressed by the reverential manner and silent eloquence of the preacher." On 26 April 1888 he became Reverend of Christ Church Lodge at Winchester. In Brighton in 1912, Pearce served as interpreter at the funeral of William Sleight, who had provided his school education. He retired in 1924, having served in the diocese for 43 years.

Historical context
To put Pearce into the context of his time, although he was the first deaf Anglican preacher whose service was formally ratified by ordination and benefice, he was not the first or only person to preach to the deaf by sign language in England. For example, in 1846, before Pearce was born, the Leeds Intelligencer cites two instances which drew praise in Yorkshire:

See also
 Charles Baker (instructor)

Notes

References

External links
 

1855 births
1928 deaths
19th-century Anglican deacons
English deaf people
Deaf religious workers
Educators of the deaf
20th-century Anglican deacons
Clergy from Southampton
19th-century Church of England clergy
20th-century Church of England clergy